The Baharna are the indigenous Shia Muslim inhabitants of Bahrain who inhabited the area before the arrival of Sunni Muslim Arab tribes from Najd, particularly by Banu Utbah in the 18th century which the Bahraini royal family is from. They are generally regarded by scholars and Bahraini people to be the original inhabitants of the Bahrain archipelago. Most Shi'i Bahraini citizens are Baharna. Regions with most of the population are in Eastern Arabia (Bahrain, Qatif, al-Hasa), with historical diaspora populations in Kuwait, (see Baharna in Kuwait), Saudi Arabia, Qatar, United Arab Emirates, Oman, Khuzestan Province in Iran, and United States. Some Bahrainis are from other parts of the world too. Some Baharna nowadays, have some sort of Ajami ancestry due to intermarriage between the Ajam and Baharna.

Origin
The origin of the Baharna is uncertain; there are different theories regarding their origins. Several Western scholars believe the Baharna originate from Bahrain's ancient population and pre-Islamic population which consisted of partially-Christianized Arabs, Persian Zoroastrians, Jews, and Arab Aramaic-speaking agriculturalists. According to one historian, Arab settlements in Bahrain may have begun around 300 B.C. and control of the island was maintained by the Rabyah tribe, who converted to Islam in 630 A.D.

There are many gaps and inconsistencies in the genealogies of those claiming descent from the Banu Abd al-Qays in Bahrain, therefore Baharna are probably descendants of an ethnically-mixed population of Arab-Iranian origins.

The Bahrani Arabic dialect exhibits Akkadian, Aramaic and Syriac features. The sedentary people of pre-Islamic Bahrain were Arabean Aramaic speakers and to some degree Persian speakers, while Syriac functioned as a liturgical language. The Bahrani dialect might have borrowed the Akkadian, Aramaic and Syriac features from Mesopotamian Arabic.

According to Robert Bertram Serjeant, the Baharna may be the last of the  "descendants of converts from the original population of Christians (Aramaeans), Jews and ancient Persians (Majus) inhabiting the island and cultivated coastal provinces of Eastern Arabia at the time of the Arab conquest". Although this is unlikely as a predominant Arab population in Eastern Arabia and Bahrain likely predates that the Islamic expansions of the 7th Century by a few centuries and 200 years before the Persian conquests of Khuzestan and Balochistan.

Etymology

The term Bahrani serves to distinguish the Bahrani people from the Baharna people in Bahrain, such as the ethnic Persian Bahrainis who fall under the term Ajam, as well as from the Sunni Najdi in Bahrain who are known as Al Arab ("Arabs"), such as Bani Utbah. In the United Arab Emirates, the Baharna make up 5% of Emiratis and are generally descended from Baharna coming around 100–200 years ago.

In Arabic, bahrayn is the dual form of bahr ("sea"), so al-Bahrayn means "the Two Seas". However, which two seas were originally intended remains in dispute. The term appears five times in the Qur'an, but does not refer to the modern islandoriginally known to the Arabs as "Awal".

Today, Bahrain's "two seas" are instead generally taken to be the bay east and west of the island, the seas north and south of the island, or the salt and fresh water present above and below the ground. In addition to wells, there are places in the sea north of Bahrain where fresh water bubbles up in the middle of the salt water, noted by visitors since antiquity.

An alternate theory offered by al-Ahsa was that the two seas were the Persian/Arabian Gulf  and a peaceful lake on the mainland Near Al-Ahsa, known as Al-Asfar Lake;still another provided by Ismail ibn Hammad al-Jawhari is that the more formal name Bahri (lit. "belonging to the sea") would have been misunderstood and so was opted against.

History

Local anecdotal evidence suggests that the Baharna's Arab ancestry is diverse as some word variants spoken in the dialects of the native people of the villages of Bani Jamra and A'ali are only used in places as far as Yemen and Oman, indicating their predominant Arab component. Members of the Banu Abdul Qays in Eastern Arabia were mostly Nestorian Christians before the seventh century.

See also
 History of Bahrain
Language and culture
 Bahrani Arabic
 Shia Islam in Saudi Arabia
Geography
 Bahrain (historical region)
Bahrani People
 List of Bahranis
 Baharna in Kuwait

References

External links
 The 1922 Bahrani uprising in Bahrain
 Rival Empires of Trade and Imami Shiism in Eastern Arabia, 1300-1800, Juan Cole, International Journal of Middle East Studies, Vol. 19, No. 2, (May 1987), pp. 177–203
 Eastern Coast of Arabian Peninsula for DNA test

 
Ancient peoples
Arab groups
Ethnic groups in the Middle East
Ethnic groups in the Arab world
Ethnic groups in Bahrain
Ethnic groups in Oman
Ethnic groups in Kuwait
Semitic-speaking peoples
Shia communities
Social groups of Oman
Ethnoreligious groups in Asia